Artur Uibopuu (12 January 1879, in Sooru Parish (now Valga Parish), Kreis Walk – 2 April 1930, in Tallinn) was an Estonian politician. He was a member of Estonian Constituent Assembly, representing the Estonian People's Party.

References

1879 births
1930 deaths
People from Valga Parish
People from Kreis Walk
Estonian People's Party politicians
Members of the Estonian Constituent Assembly